Bridgeport is a census-designated place (CDP) and unincorporated community that is part of Logan Township, in Gloucester County, in the U.S. state of New Jersey. At the 2020 United States census, the population of the CDP was 389. in the 2010 census, the population was 504.

The area is served as United States Postal Service ZIP Code 08014.

History
Bridgeport, along with Swedesboro (Sveaborg) and Finns Point (Varkens Kill), was one of only three settlements established in New Jersey as a part of the New Sweden colony, the fort at Nya Elfsborg having been abandoned. The settlement was founded around 1650, and originally called Nya Stockholm, "New Stockholm", but the name was changed at a later date.

After the 2001 anthrax attacks, a facility was set up in Bridgeport for the use of a continuous wave accelerator called a Rhodotron, from the Belgian company IBA, to irradiate federal mail.

Geography
Bridgeport lies along the Delaware River at the mouth of the Raccoon Creek. U.S. Route 322 (US 322) enters New Jersey in Bridgeport via the Commodore Barry Bridge, and continues on to cross US 130 and Interstate 295 before leaving Logan Township. Route 44 is an old alignment of US 130, beginning at a point north of US 322. Route 324 is an east-west state highway completely within Bridgeport, running from where a ferry used to take US 322 across the river to a dead end next to the current US 322. Bridgeport Speedway is located in the community. There is a private marina and a small airfield in town, and a Penns Grove Secondary line crosses Raccoon Creek at the Conrail Railroad Bridge in Bridgeport at mile 2.0.

Demographics

References

External links
 Official Logan Township website

Logan Township, New Jersey
Unincorporated communities in Gloucester County, New Jersey
Unincorporated communities in New Jersey
Swedish-American history
Finnish-American history
Swedish American culture in New Jersey
Finnish-American culture in New Jersey
New Sweden
17th-century establishments in New Sweden